Sébastien Jacquemyns (25 June 1929 – 21 May 1976) was a Belgian footballer. He played in two matches for the Belgium national football team in 1955.

References

External links
 

1929 births
1976 deaths
Belgian footballers
Belgium international footballers
Place of birth missing
Association footballers not categorized by position